Orton F. Keyes (February 14, 1895 – October 1, 1983) was an American college football player and coach. He served as the head football coach at the University of Wisconsin–Platteville from 1921 to 1926, compiling a record of 15–24–4.

References

External links
 

1895 births
Year of death missing
Wisconsin Badgers football players
Wisconsin–Platteville Pioneers football coaches
People from Waldo, Wisconsin